Gary Jacobs may refer to:

 Gary Jacobs (solicitor) (c. 1946–2002), British solicitor
 Gary Jacobs (writer), American television comedy writer and producer
 Gary Jacobs (boxer) (born 1965), former Scottish boxer
 Gary E. Jacobs (born 1962), American businessman, philanthropist and minority owner in the Sacramento Kings